Alex Spillum (born 1999 in Chanhassen, Minnesota) is a professional American football player for the Berlin Thunder in the European League of Football.

Early Life
Alex Spillum attended Chanhassen High School where he played football, baseball and also lettered in track and field. For the football team he played quarterback, wide receiver and safety. After moving from wide receiver to quarterback for his senior year, he led the Storm to an undefeated regular season and the third round of the Class 5A state tournament. At the end, he was selected to play on the Minnesota Football Showcase South Roster for the All-Star Game as a defensive back and was rated as a two-star recruit by 247Sports.com in his senior year.

College carrer
After his high school career, Spillum had offers from North Carolina University, South Carolina University and CCU, committing to the Chanticleers on 17 January 2017. In his time there, he was a two-time All-Sun Belt third-team selection and was All-Conference Honoree from Phil Steele in both 2020 and 2021. In the 2021 Cure Bowl win, he made a remarkable play, tackling his own teammate after a recovered forced fumble to keep ball possession.
In his four years, Spillum played in 46 games. He totaled 184 tackles, including 101 solo stops and 83 assisted tackles, to go along with 5.5 tackles-for-loss, 1.0 sacks, seven interceptions, 17 passes defended, one forced fumble, two fumble recoveries, and two blocked kicks.

Professional carrer

2022 NFL Draft

In the 2022 NFL Draft Spillum went undrafted.

After the Draft, the Green Bay Packers invited Spillum to their Rookie Minicamp. After being only there for two days, he was cut from the Packers roster. Shortly after, he was invited by Tampa Bay Buccaneers for their training camp.

Berlin Thunder
Prior in joining the Thunder, Spillum played shortly with the Schwäbisch Hall Unicorns in the German Football League for the 2022 season.
On 16 November 2022 the Berlin franchise signed Spillum for a one-year-deal.

Professional statistics

Weblinks
 Costal Carolina Bio
 ESPN Bio

References

1999 births
Living people
American football safeties
Berlin Thunder (ELF) players
German Football League players
American expatriate players of American football
American expatriate sportspeople in Germany